The 2018 LNFA season is the 24th season of American football in Spain.

Teams were divided into two categories, named Serie A and B.

Badalona Dracs are the defending champions.

LNFA Serie A

Competition format changes
The FEFA agreed to expand the Serie A to three groups of five teams according to geographical criteria, for reducing the economical costs for the clubs.

After the resignation of runners-up Reus Imperials to continue playing the league due to financial difficulties only two days before the start of the season, the Group A was reduced to four teams.

At the end of the regular season, The twelve best qualified teams overall will qualify to the playoffs while the two worst teams will play the relegation playoffs.

Tiebreakers
If two or more teams are tied at the end of the competition, the ranking of teams in each group is based on the following criteria:
 Highest percentage of wins in games between tied teams.
 Lowest percentage of points against in games between tied teams.
 Highest difference between points scored and points against in games between tied teams.
 Lowest percentage of points against in all the games.
 Highest difference between points scored and points against in all the games.
 Lowest percentage of sent off players in all the games.
 Drawing of lots.

Stadia and locations

Fifteen teams entered the LNFA Serie A, the top-tier level of American football in Spain, after the changes in the competition format.

Regular season

Group A

Group B

Group C

Overall standings

Playoffs

Copa de España
Prior to the season, the Copa de España was played between the THREE teams that registered in the competition.

Badalona Dracs achieved their third trophy ever.

The final was played at Polideportivo Batiste Subies, in La Pobla de Farnals.

References

External links
Spanish American Football Federation
Fieldgoal.eu

Liga Nacional de Fútbol Americano
2018 in Spanish sport
2018 in American football